Chinese funeral rituals comprise a set of traditions broadly associated with Chinese folk religion, with different rites depending on the age of the deceased, the cause of death, and the deceased's marital and social statuses. Different rituals are carried out in different parts of China, and many contemporary Chinese people carry out funerals according to various religious faiths such as Buddhism or Christianity. However, in general, the funeral ceremony itself is carried out over seven days, and mourners wear funerary dress according to their relationship to the deceased. Traditionally, white clothing is symbolic of the dead, while red is not usually worn, as it is traditionally the symbolic colour of happiness worn at Chinese weddings. The number three is significant, with many customary gestures being carried out three times.

While traditionally inhumation was favoured, in the present day the dead are often cremated rather than buried, particularly in large cities in China. According to the Chinese Ministry of Civil Affairs (MCA), of the 9.77 million deaths in 2014, 4.46 million, or 45.6%, were cremated.

History 

Throughout history, Chinese people have carried out complex funeral rites, with tombs of early rulers rivalling ancient Egyptian tombs in their funerary art and provision for the dead in the afterlife. The late 3rd century BCE Terracotta Army contains approximately 9,000 terracotta figures that were buried to protect Qin Shi Huang, the first Emperor of China.

Traditional burial customs show a strong belief in life after death and the need for ancestor veneration among the living; Confucian philosophy calls for paying respect to one's ancestors as an act of filial piety (孝 xiào). These ideals still inform funeral rites for many Chinese people today.

Practice 

It is customary for relatives to hold vigils over the dying, in order to accompany them until the very last moment before entering the afterlife. This process, called shǒu líng (守靈), is a way for loved ones to show filial piety and loyalty to the deceased. Family members thus take shifts to watch over a relative on their deathbed.

It is common to place a white banner over the door of the household to signify that a death has occurred. Families will usually gather to carry out funeral rituals, in order both to show respect for the dead and to strengthen the bonds of the kin group. Those with closer relationships to the dead (i.e. sons and daughters) wear white garments, while more distant relatives wear garments in different colours of white, black, blue and green. The colours red, yellow, and brown are traditionally not worn during the mourning period, which may last up to three years. Before a funeral, an obituary notice fùwén (訃聞) is commonly sent to relatives and friends announcing the date and time of the funeral procession. The date is usually selected as an auspicious one according to the Chinese fortune calendar (通勝 tōng shèng).

The deceased is dressed in clean funeral dress (小殮 xiǎo liàn) in preparation for their departure from the world (人世 rén shì) and journey into the afterlife (來世 lái shì). Dà liàn (大殮) is the ritual of transferring the body of deceased into the coffin (入木 rù mù), which will rest in the funeral hall decorated with four-character idioms (成语 cheng yu) prior to the burial or cremation. Before the funeral procession, the jiā jì (家祭) is held. According to the closeness and status of the family members, they will pay respects diàn (奠) to the deceased.

According to Chinese custom, an elder should never show respect to someone younger. So, if the deceased is a young bachelor, for example, his body cannot be brought home and must remain at the funeral parlour. His parents cannot offer prayers to their son either. Since he was unmarried, he did not have any children who could perform these same rites for him. (This is why the body cannot come into the family home.) If an infant or child dies, no funeral rites are performed either since respect cannot be shown to a younger person. The child is thus buried in silence.

The funeral procession (發引 fā yǐn) is the process of bringing the hearse to the burial site or site of cremation. During the funeral, offerings of food items, incense, and joss paper are commonly presented. The offering of food and joss paper signifies the continuing interdependence between the deceased and their living descendants. Taoist or Buddhist prayers are sometimes carried out by monks, to help the deceased's soul to find peace and escape the fate of becoming a "restless ghost".

Every year at the Qing Ming Festival (清明節), people pay respect to their ancestors by visiting their graves and tidying up their tombstones. Later generations are invited to participate through this process of ancestor veneration (慎終追遠 shèn zhōng zhuī yuǎn).

See also 
 Filial mourning
 Ancestor veneration in China
 Colour in Chinese culture 
 Chinese burial money

References 

Practices in Chinese folk religion
Funerals in China